Donald Frank (born October 24, 1965 in Edgecombe County, North Carolina) is a former professional American football player who played cornerback for six seasons for the Los Angeles Raiders, San Diego Chargers, and Minnesota Vikings.

1965 births
American football cornerbacks
Winston-Salem State Rams football players
Los Angeles Raiders players
San Diego Chargers players
Minnesota Vikings players
Living people
Players of American football from North Carolina
People from Edgecombe County, North Carolina